Cameroonian cuisine (French: cuisine camerounaise) is one of the most varied in Africa due to Cameroon's location on the crossroads between the north, west, and center of the continent; the diversity in ethnicity with mixture ranging from Bantus, Semi-bantus and Shuwa Arabs, as well as the influence of German, French and English colonialization.

Ingredients
The soil of most of the country is very fertile and a wide variety of vegetables and fruits, both domestic and imported species, are grown. These include:

Cassava
Plantain
Peanuts
Fufu
Hot pepper/Penja white pepper
Maize
Eggplant
Okra
Bitterleaf
Tomato
Cocoyam
Bananas

Specialties

Among Cameroonian specialties are:
 Fufu corn and njama njama (garden huckleberry leaves) 
 Brochettes, known locally as soya (a kind of barbecued kebab made from chicken, beef, or goat) 
 Sangah (a mixture of maize, cassava leaf, and palm nut juice)
 Mbanga soup and kwacoco
 Eru and water fufu
 Ndolé (a spicy stew containing bitterleaf greens, meat, shrimp, pork rind, and peanut paste)

 Koki (food) (primarily consisting of blackeyed peas and red palm oil)

 Achu soup (cocoyam fufu with an orange/yellow red palm oil soup)

 Mbongo'o tjobi (a spicy black soup made with native herbs and spices)

 Egusi soup (ground pumpkin seeds often cooked with dark leafy greens or okra)
 Kondreh (stewed unripe plantains with herbs and spices, usually cooked with goat meat)
Kati kati, a grilled chicken dish and traditional food of the Kom.

Curries, soups and fish dishes abound, as well as meats on skewers. Insects are eaten in some parts of the country (particularly the forested regions).

See also
 List of African cuisines

References

 
Central African cuisine